Worker-Peasant-Soldier students were Chinese students who entered colleges between 1970 and 1976, during the later part of the Cultural Revolution (1966–1976). They were accepted not for their academic qualifications, but rather for their work experience as workers, peasants, or soldiers favored by the Chinese Communist Party as part of the "Five Red Categories" and enjoyed affirmative action during the Cultural Revolution. No one was admitted directly from high school without work experience. 

In 1977, after Chairman Mao Zedong's death, the Worker-Peasant-Soldier program ended when Deng Xiaoping reinstated the National Higher Education Entrance Examination, where high school graduates were once again allowed to enter colleges without having to work first.

Notable students
 Xi Jinping, General Secretary of the Chinese Communist Party (since 2012), studied at Tsinghua University as a Worker-Peasant-Soldier student.
 Zhao Leji (赵乐际; 1957) is a senior leader of the Chinese Communist Party and the Secretary of the Central Commission for Discipline Inspection, studied at Peking University
 Wang Qishan (王岐山; 1948) was a member of the Politburo Standing Committee from 2012 to 2017 and served as the Secretary of the Central Commission for Discipline Inspection; he studied at Northwest University

References

Cultural Revolution
Higher education in China
Maoist terminology
1977 disestablishments in China
Peasants